Allium carmeli  is a species of flowering plant in the Amaryllidaceae family. It is found in Israel, Palestine, Syria and Lebanon. It is a bulb-forming perennial with pink flowers.

The specific epithet, carmeli, refers to Mount Carmel in northern Israel.

References

carmeli
Onions
Flora of Lebanon and Syria
Flora of Palestine (region)
Plants described in 1854
Taxa named by Pierre Edmond Boissier